Daniel G. Goldstein (born 1969) is an American cognitive psychologist known for the specification and testing of heuristics and models of bounded rationality in the field of judgment and decision making. He is an honorary research fellow at London Business School and works with Microsoft Research as a principal researcher.

Education
Goldstein received his Bachelor of Science degree in computer science from the University of Wisconsin–Madison in 1993 and a Ph.D. in Cognitive Psychology from the University of Chicago in 1997.

Career
Goldstein and his doctoral advisor Gerd Gigerenzer started the Center for Adaptive Behavior and Cognition at the Max Planck Institute in Germany, where Goldstein worked as a research scientist for several years.

In 2002, Goldstein became associate director of the Center for the Decision Sciences at Columbia University before becoming an assistant professor of marketing at London Business School in 2005. In 2009, Goldstein accepted an offer as a principal research scientist at Yahoo! Research. In 2012, Goldstein was part of a group of Yahoo scientists who left en masse to found the New York City lab of Microsoft Research, where he is senior principal research manager.

Goldstein's doctoral thesis used computer simulation to study the accuracy and frugality of satisficing heuristics for making inferences. Investigations of the take-the-best heuristic and the recognition heuristic were later published as journal articles in Psychological Review and in the book Simple Heuristics That Make Us Smart. These fast and frugal heuristics have since had an impact in medicine, law and politics, and other areas outside psychology. With Eric J. Johnson, Goldstein authored an article on organ donation in the journal Science Along with Nobel Laureate William F. Sharpe, he created the Distribution Builder method for eliciting probability distributions. Hal Hershfield and Goldstein ran virtual reality experiments in which people saw renderings of themselves as senior citizens and increased their intentions to save for retirement, as discussed in Goldstein's TED talk The Battle Between Your Present and Future Self.

In 2014, Goldstein was elected president of the Society for Judgment and Decision Making.

Notable contributions 
 Recognition heuristic
 Take-the-best heuristic

References

Selected publications (listed chronologically)

External links
 
 Decision Science News, edited by Goldstein
 
 "The battle between your present and future self" (TEDSalon NY2011)

1969 births
Living people
21st-century American psychologists
University of Wisconsin–Madison faculty
University of Wisconsin–Madison College of Letters and Science alumni
Academic staff of Max Planck Society
20th-century American psychologists